Gallo may refer to:

Related to Gaul:
Gallo-Roman culture
Gallo language, a regional language of France
Gallo-Romance, a branch of Romance languages
Gallo-Italic or Gallo-Italian language, a branch spoken in Northern Italy of the Romance languages
Gallo-Italic of Sicily, a group of Gallo-Italic dialects spoken in central-eastern Sicily
Gallo-Brittonic languages, Celtic languages of Gaul and Britain
Gallo-Roman religion, a fusion of the traditional religious practices of the Gauls and the Roman and Hellenistic religions

Places
Gallo Matese, a commune in the province of Caserta, Italy
Gällö, a locality in Bräcke Municipality, Jämtland County, Sweden
Gallo river, a tributary of the Tagus
San Gallo, Italian name for St. Gallen

People
Gallo (surname)
Gallo (footballer) (1893–1978), Brazilian footballer
Gallo, nickname for Italian basketball player Danilo Gallinari of the Los Angeles Clippers

Fictional characters
Boss Gallo, in the video game Star Wars: Galactic Battlegrounds

Other uses
 Gallo (beer), from Guatemala
Gallo Record Company, South African record label
E & J Gallo Winery, California winery and distributor

See also 

 
 
 Gallos (disambiguation)
 Galo (disambiguation)
 Gaul (disambiguation)